Alders are trees comprising the genus Alnus in the birch family Betulaceae. The genus comprises about 35 species of monoecious trees and shrubs, a few reaching a large size, distributed throughout the north temperate zone with a few species extending into Central America, as well as the northern and southern Andes.

Description 

With a few exceptions, alders are deciduous, and the leaves are alternate, simple, and serrated. The flowers are catkins with elongate male catkins on the same plant as shorter female catkins, often before leaves appear; they are mainly wind-pollinated, but also visited by bees to a small extent. These trees differ from the birches (Betula, another genus in the family) in that the female catkins are woody and do not disintegrate at maturity, opening to release the seeds in a similar manner to many conifer cones.

By contrast, the widespread Alnus alnobetula (green alder) is rarely more than a  shrub.

Taxonomy

Classification 

The genus is divided into three subgenera:

Subgenus Alnus 
Trees with stalked shoot buds, male and female catkins produced in autumn (fall) but stay closed over winter, pollinating in late winter or early spring, about 15–25 species, including:

 Alnus acuminata Kunth – Andean alder, aliso. Mexico, Central and South America.
 subsp. acuminata Kunth
 subsp. arguta (Schltdl.) Furlow
 subsp. glabrata (Fernald) Furlow
 Alnus cordata  (Loisel.) Duby – Italian alder. Italy, Corsica.
 Alnus cremastogyne Burkill – China.
 Alnus firma Siebold & Zucc. – Kyūshū Island in Japan
 Alnus glutinosa (L.) Gaertn. – black alder. Europe, Central Asia.
 subsp. barbata (C.A.Mey.) Yalt.
 subsp. glutinosa (L.) Gaertn.
 subsp. incisa (Willd.) Regel
 subsp. laciniata (Willd.) Regel
 Alnus hirsuta (Spach) Rupr. – Manchurian alder. Japan, Korea, Manchuria, Siberia, Russian Far East

 Alnus incana (L.) Moench
 subsp. incana (L.) Moench – speckled alder or grey alder. Eurasia, North America
 subsp. kolaensis (Orlova) Á.Löve & D.Löve
 subsp. rugosa (Du Roi) R.T.Clausen
 subsp. tenuifolia (Nutt.) Breitung
 Alnus japonica (Thunb.) Steud. – Japanese alder, Japan, Korea, Taiwan, eastern China, Russian Far East
 Alnus jorullensis Kunth – Mexican alder. Mexico, Guatemala, Honduras.
 subsp. lutea Furlow	
 subsp. jorullensis Kunth
 Alnus lusitanica Vít, Douda, & Mandák - Spain, Portugal, Morocco
 Alnus matsumurae Callier – Honshū Island in Japan
 Alnus nepalensis D.Don – Nepalese alder. Himalayas, Tibet, Yunnan, Nepal, Bhutan, Myanmar, Thailand.
 Alnus oblongifolia Torr. – Arizona alder. Arizona, New Mexico, Sonora, Chihuahua
 Alnus orientalis Decne. – Oriental alder. Southern Turkey, northwest Syria, Cyprus, Lebanon, Iran
 Alnus rhombifolia Nutt. – white alder. California, Nevada, Oregon, Washington, Idaho, Montana
 Alnus rohlenae Vít, Douda, & Mandák - Western Balkans
 Alnus rubra Bong. – red alder. Alaska, Yukon, British Columbia, California, Oregon, Washington, Idaho, Montana.

 Alnus serrulata  (Aiton) Willd. – hazel alder, tag alder or smooth alder. Eastern North America
 Alnus subcordata  C.A.Mey. – Caucasian alder. Caucasus, Iran
 Alnus tenuifolia Nutt. – thinleaf or mountain alder. Northwestern North America
 Alnus trabeculosa Hand.-Mazz. – China, Japan

Subgenus Clethropsis 
Trees or shrubs with stalked shoot buds, male and female catkins produced in autumn (fall) and expanding and pollinating then, three species:
 Alnus formosana (Burkill) Makino – Formosan alder. Taiwan
 Alnus maritima (Marshall) Muhl. ex Nutt. – seaside alder. United States (Georgia, Delaware, Maryland, Oklahoma).
 Alnus nitida (Spach) Endl. – Himalayan alder. Western Himalaya, Pakistan, India, Nepal.

Subgenus Alnobetula 
Shrubs with shoot buds not stalked, male and female catkins produced in late spring (after leaves appear) and expanding and pollinating then, one to four species:

 Alnus alnobetula (Ehrh.) K.Koch
 subsp. alnobetula (Ehrh.) K.Koch
 subsp. crispa (Aiton) Raus
 subsp. fruticosa (Rupr.) Raus
 subsp. sinuata (Regel) Raus
 subsp. suaveolens (Req.) Lambinon & Kerguélen
 Alnus firma Siebold & Zucc. - Kyushu (Japan)
 Alnus mandshurica (Callier) Hand.-Mazz. – Russian Far East, northeastern China, Korea
 Alnus maximowiczii Callier – Japan, Korea, Russian Far East
 Alnus pendula  Matsum. - Honshu and Hokkaido (Japan)
 Alnus sieboldiana  Matsum. - Honshu, Shikoku, and Suwanose-jima (Japan)

Not assigned to a subgenus 
 Alnus fauriei H.Lév. & Vaniot – Honshu Island in Japan
 Alnus ferdinandi-coburgii C.K.Schneid. – southern China
 Alnus glutipes (Jarm. ex Czerpek) Vorosch.
 Alnus hakkodensis Hayashi – Honshu Island in Japan
 Alnus henryi C.K.Schneid. – Taiwan
 Alnus lanata Duthie ex Bean – Sichuan Province in China
 Alnus mairei H.Lév. – Yunnan Province in China
 Alnus paniculata Nakai – Korea
 Alnus serrulatoides Callier – Japan
 Alnus vermicularis Nakai – Korea

Species names with uncertain taxonomic status 
The status of the following species is unresolved:

 Alnus balatonialis Borbás
 Alnus cuneata Geyer ex Walp.
 Alnus dimitrovii Jordanov & Kitanov
 Alnus djavanshirii H.Zare – Iran
 Alnus dolichocarpa H.Zare, Amini & Assadi – Iran
 Alnus figerti Callier
 Alnus frangula L. ex Huth
 Alnus gigantea Nakai
 Alnus glandulosa Sarg.
 Alnus henedae Sugim.
 Alnus hybrida Rchb.
 Alnus laciniata Ehrh.
 Alnus lobata Nyman
 Alnus microphylla Arv.-Touv.
 Alnus obtusifolia Mert. ex Regel
 Alnus oxyacantha Lavalle
 Alnus subrotunda Desf.
 Alnus vilmoriana Lebas
 Alnus washingtonia Wetzel

Hybrids 
The following hybrids have been described:
 Alnus × elliptica Req.—Italy. (A. cordata × A. glutinosa)
 Alnus × fallacina  Callier—Ohio, New York State, Vermont, New Hampshire, Maine. (A. incana subsp. rugosa × A. serrulata)
 Alnus × hanedae Suyinata—Japan. (A. firma × A. sieboldiana)
 Alnus × hosoii Mizush.—Japan. (A. maximowiczii × A. pendula)
 Alnus × mayrii Callier—Russian Far East, Japan. (A. hirsuta × A. japonica)
 Alnus × peculiaris Hiyama—Kyūshū Island in Japan. (A. firma × A. pendula)
 Alnus × pubescens Tausch.—Northern and central Europe. (A. glutinosa × A. incana)
 Alnus × suginoi Sugim.—Japan.

The status of the following hybrids is unresolved:

 Alnus × aschersoniana Callier
 Alnus × koehnei Callier
 Alnus × ljungeri Murai
 Alnus × purpusii Callier
 Alnus × silesiaca Fiek
 Alnus × spaethii Callier (A. japonica × A. subcordata)

Fossils 
 †Alnus heterodonta (Newberry) Meyer & Manchester 1987 – Oligocene fossil, Oregon

Phylogeny 
The oldest fossil pollen that can be identified as Alnus is from northern Bohemia, dating to the late Paleocene, around 58 million years ago.

Etymology 
The common name alder evolved from the Old English word alor, which in turn is derived from Proto-Germanic root aliso. The generic name Alnus is the equivalent Latin name, from whence French aulne and Spanish Alamo (Spanish term for "poplar").

Ecology 
Alders are commonly found near streams, rivers, and wetlands. Sometimes where the prevalence of alders is particularly prominent these are called alder carrs. In the Pacific Northwest of North America, the white alder (Alnus rhombifolia) unlike other northwest alders, has an affinity for warm, dry climates, where it grows along watercourses, such as along the lower Columbia River east of the Cascades and the Snake River, including Hells Canyon.

Alder leaves and sometimes catkins are used as food by numerous butterflies and moths.

A. glutinosa and A. viridis are classed as environmental weeds in New Zealand. Alder leaves and especially the roots are important to the ecosystem because they enrich the soil with nitrogen and other nutrients.

Nitrogen fixation and succession of woodland species

Alder is particularly noted for its important symbiotic relationship with Frankia alni, an actinomycete, filamentous, nitrogen-fixing bacterium. This bacterium is found in root nodules, which may be as large as a human fist, with many small lobes, and light brown in colour. The bacterium absorbs nitrogen from the air and makes it available to the tree. Alder, in turn, provides the bacterium with sugars, which it produces through photosynthesis. As a result of this mutually beneficial relationship, alder improves the fertility of the soil where it grows, and as a pioneer species, it helps provide additional nitrogen for the successional species to follow.

Because of its abundance, red alder delivers large amounts of nitrogen to enrich forest soils. From Alaska to Oregon, Alnus viridis subsp. sinuata (A. sinuata, Sitka Alder or Slide Alder), characteristically pioneer fresh, gravelly sites at the foot of retreating glaciers. Alders are common among the first species to colonize disturbed areas from floods, windstorms, fires, landslides, etc. Alder groves often serve as natural firebreaks since these broad-leaved trees are much less flammable than conifers. Their foliage and leaf litter does not carry a fire well, and their thin bark is sufficiently resistant to protect them from light surface fires. In addition, the light weight of alder seedsnumbering allows for easy dispersal by the wind. Although it outgrows coastal Douglas-fir for the first 25 years, it is very shade intolerant and seldom lives more than 100 years. Red alder is the Pacific Northwest's largest alder and the most plentiful and commercially important broad-leaved tree in the coastal Northwest. Alders largely help create conditions favorable for giant conifers that replace them.

Parasites 
Alder roots are parasitized by northern groundcone.

Uses 

The catkins of some alder species have a degree of edibility, and may be rich in protein. Reported to have a bitter and unpleasant taste, they are more useful for survival purposes. The wood of certain alder species is often used to smoke various food items such as coffee, salmon, and other seafood.

Most of the pilings that form the foundation of Venice were made from alder trees.

Alder bark contains the anti-inflammatory salicin, which is metabolized into salicylic acid in the body. Some Native American cultures use red alder bark (Alnus rubra) to treat poison oak, insect bites, and skin irritations. Blackfeet Indians have traditionally used an infusion made from the bark of red alder to treat lymphatic disorders and tuberculosis. Recent clinical studies have verified that red alder contains betulin and lupeol, compounds shown to be effective against a variety of tumors.

The inner bark of the alder, as well as red osier dogwood, or chokecherry, is used by some Indigenous peoples of the Americas in smoking mixtures, known as kinnikinnick, to improve the taste of the bearberry leaf.

Alder is illustrated in the coat of arms for the Austrian town of Grossarl.

Electric guitars, most notably those manufactured by the Fender Musical Instruments Corporation, have been built with alder bodies since the 1950s. Alder is appreciated for its tone that is claimed to be tight and evenly balanced, especially when compared to mahogany, and has been adopted by many electric guitar manufacturers.

As a hardwood, alder is used in making furniture, cabinets, and other woodworking products.

Alder bark and wood (like oak and sweet chestnut) contain tannin and are traditionally used to tan leather.

A red dye can also be extracted from the outer bark, and a yellow dye from the inner bark.

Culture 
Ermanno Olmi's movie The Tree of Wooden Clogs (L' Albero Degli Zoccoli, 1978) refers in its title to alder, typically used to make clogs as in this movie's plot.

References

Further reading

External links 

 Flora Europaea: Alnus
 Flora of Bolivia: Alnus
 Flora of China: Alnus
 Flora of North America: Alnus
 Flora of Pakistan: Alnus

 
Taxa named by Philip Miller